Aceoseius is a genus of mites in the family Ascidae.

Species
 Aceoseius muricatus (C.L. Koch, 1839)

References

Ascidae